Sculley is a surname. Notable people with the name include:

David Sculley, American businessman
John Sculley (born 1939), American businessman and entrepreneur
Sheryl Sculley (born 1952), American politician

See also
Scully (surname)
Skully (disambiguation), includes people with the surname Skully